SGFC Eagles Maryland was a professional soccer club based in Maryland. The club competed in the American Soccer League during the league's third and final season in 2017. The team was originally called the Super Green Football Club when it was founded in 1999.

History 
Founded in 1999 as The Super Green Football Club, the team participated in the 2009 Bob Marley Tournament and won the championship that season. Later in the year, the team participated in the Baltimore Mayor's Cup, a Maryland Major Soccer League tournament, where they lost in the finals. The Super Green FC team are also known within the Metropolitan area of Washington DC as the Screaming Eagles and the SGFC Eagles Athletics Sports Club. The team also won the Maryland state title "Rowland Cup" in 2013 with a victory over the Baltimore Bays, and represented Region 1 in the Lamar Hunt US Open Cup (MDCVA) prior to National Cup disqualification for having players on their roster who were not qualified to play in the tournament.

In late 2016, the American Soccer League (ASL) added the Super Green Football Club as an affiliate of ASL, rebranded in August 2016 as the SGFC Eagles Maryland Sports Club. Along with a new team name, the club unveiled a new logo that was developed with significant fan input. The club was focused on representing Baltimore and all of the cities and cultures that make up the state of Maryland.

On January 2, 2017, it was announced that Obatola Gabriel, formerly of Sisaket FC, a first division team in Thailand, had signed with SGFC. Joining this ex-international was Penang FA's highest goal scorer, Ranti Martins, who had previously played in Malaysia's Super League for Penang FA after being released by East Bengal at the end of the previous season.

SGFC competed in the ASL for the 2017 season. The ASL folded at the end of that season.

In February 2019, SGFC Eagles Maryland applied to compete in the National Independent Soccer Association, the third tier of the United States soccer league system. In preparation for the 2020 spring season, SGFC competed in and won the 2019 All Nigeria Soccer Tournament in Los Angeles, California.

Year-by-year results

Affiliated clubs
In 2016, SGFC's board announced the beginning of the affiliation link with the 36 Lion Football Club Lagos as a sister club.

Colors and badge

The team's colors and original logo were announced in October 2016 during a presentation in Baltimore. Green and white are the SGFC Eagles' primary colors, with three white stripes along the shoulder. The final design incorporates team history through the vintage logo of soaring eagles. It also includes the Maryland state flag.

Stadium 

The home ground of SGFC Eagles Maryland is Paint Branch High School's stadium, a multi-purpose sports facility located in Burtonsville, Maryland.

Training facilities 

Since the club's founding in 1999, the SGFC Eagles' training field was MNCPPC Recreation Park located in Metzerott, College Park, adjacent to the University of Maryland campus.

In 2017, the SGFC Eagles moved their training sessions to the Cardinal Ribbons Training Complex in Baltimore.

Players – 2019 season 

SGFC Eagles has 26 players: 18 active players (Team A) and eight players grouped for a feeder team and developmental U-21 (Team B).

Transfers / out on loan to Clubside

Club officials

Personnel

Management

References 

Soccer clubs in Baltimore
American Soccer League (2014–2017) teams